Mile Božić (born 6 November 1981) is a retired footballer who last played for FC Monheim.

He made his debut on the professional league level in the 2. Bundesliga for VfL Osnabrück on 3 August 2003 when he started the opening day game against LR Ahlen. Born  in Germany, he represented Croatia at under-21 international level.

References

External links 
 Profile at HNS-CFF.hr 

1981 births
Living people
Sportspeople from Leverkusen
Footballers from North Rhine-Westphalia
Association football defenders
Croatian footballers
German footballers
Bayer 04 Leverkusen II players
VfL Osnabrück players
Fortuna Düsseldorf players
1. FC Union Solingen players
1. FC Kleve players
KFC Uerdingen 05 players
2. Bundesliga players
Oberliga (football) players